"Kill or Be Killed" is a song by British rock band Muse. It was released on 21 July 2022 as the fourth single ahead of their ninth studio album Will of the People, having already debuted in live format during festival shows of their Will of the People World Tour. It was nominated for Best Metal Performance at the 65th Annual Grammy Awards.

Release history 
"Kill or Be Killed" was debuted in live format at the 4 June 2022 show of the Will of the People World Tour, at the Rock am Ring music festival in Germany, during which the previous single "Will of the People" also received its live debut. "Kill or Be Killed" was played as the first song of the encore, before the closing song "Knights of Cydonia", and without any official prior announcement from the band.

"Kill or Be Killed" was subsequently played at every following show of the tour, emerging as a fan favourite. On 14 July, Muse confirmed through social media that "Kill or Be Killed" would be released as the fourth single ahead of Will of the People two weeks later on 21 July 2022, with a thirty-second snippet of the studio version of the song becoming available to preview through TikTok later that day.

Writing and composition 
Prior to the live debut of "Kill or Be Killed", in an interview with Apple Music 1 on 17 March 2022, Matt Bellamy described "Kill or Be Killed" as "the best metal/prog track we've ever done", featuring "industrial-tinged, granite-heavy guitar riffs"; he further stated that the track could have been featured on Muse's seventh studio album, Drones. Music journalists have described "Kill or Be Killed" musically as a progressive metal and heavy metal song that includes an alternative metal-style breakdown.

Charts

References 

2022 singles
2022 songs
Muse (band) songs
Songs written by Matt Bellamy
Alternative metal songs
British heavy metal songs
Warner Records singles